Marv may refer to:

Initialism
Maneuverable reentry vehicle (MARV), a type of missile warhead
Marburg virus (MARV), a virus of humans and non-human primates
M.A.R.V., otherwise known as the Mammoth Armed Reclamation Vehicle, a fictional tank from Command & Conquer 3: Kane's Wrath

People
Marv Goldberg (born 1944), American writer and music historian in the field of rhythm & blues (R&B)
Marvin Heemeyer (1951–2004), American muffler shop owner who attacked a Colorado town with a bulldozer
Marv Johnson (1938–1993), American R&B and soul singer
Marv Newland (born 1947), American-Canadian filmmaker who specializes in animation
Marv Wolfman (born 1946), American comic book writer

Sports figures
Marv Albert (born 1941), American television and radio sportscaster
Marv Harshman (1917–2013), American college men's former basketball coach
Marv Levy (born 1925), American football coach of Buffalo Bills and executive
Marv Rotblatt (1927–2013), American left-handed baseball player for the Chicago White Sox
Marv Throneberry (1933–1994), American Major League Baseball player

Fictional people
Marv, one of the main antagonists in the Home Alone franchise portrayed by Daniel Stern in the first two films and French Stewart in the fourth one
Dr. Kio Marv (VRAM 01k, reversed)  a fictional Czech scientist in the game Metal Gear 2: Solid Snake
Marv (Sin City), a fictional character from the graphic novel series Sin City
Marv, a character from Crawl

Other uses
Marv Films, the name of Matthew Vaughn's UK-based production company
Merv, Turkmenistan, also spelled Marv
Battle of Marv, 1510

See also

Marvé Beach, a beach located in the Western Suburb of Malad in the city of Mumbai, India